Bulinus transversalis is a species of small air-breathing freshwater snail with a sinistral shell, an aquatic pulmonate gastropod mollusk in the family Planorbidae, the ramshorn snails and their allies.

This species is found in Kenya and Uganda.

References

Bulinus
Gastropods described in 1897
Taxonomy articles created by Polbot
Taxobox binomials not recognized by IUCN